Canfield may refer to:

Card games
 Canfield (solitaire), known in Britain as the patience game, Demon 
 Klondike (solitaire) known in Britain as the patience game, Canfield

Places

United States
 Canfield, Arkansas
 Canfield, Colorado
 former name of Edison Park, Chicago, Illinois, a community area
 Canfield, Ohio, a city
 Canfield, Braxton County, West Virginia, an unincorporated community
 Canfield, Randolph County, West Virginia, an unincorporated community
 Canfield Creek, a stream in Minnesota

Elsewhere
 Canfield, Ontario, Canada
 Canfield Mesa, Victoria Land, Antarctica
 Great Canfield and Little Canfield, Essex, England

People
 Canfield (surname)

Other uses
 , a World War II destroyer escort
 Canfield's, a producer and bottler of soda beverages, mainly in the Chicago area
 Canfield Speedway, Canfield, Ohio, an auto racing track
 Canfield Casino and Congress Park, Sarasota Springs, New York, a National Historic Landmark
 Canfield ocean, a geological theory